Sheepshanks is a surname. Notable people include:

Anne Sheepshanks (1794–1855), English astronomical benefactor
David Sheepshanks, British businessman
Ernest Sheepshanks (1910–1937), English cricketer
John Sheepshanks (disambiguation), multiple people
Richard Sheepshanks (1794–1855), English astronomer
Sheepshanks equatorial, of many things named for Sheepshanks this was refracting telescope of the Royal Observatory at Greenwich